Qingyang District is one of 11 urban districts of the prefecture-level city of Chengdu, the capital of Sichuan Province, Southwest China. It is bordered by Jinniu District to the northeast, Jinjiang District to the southeast, Wuhou District to the south, Shuangliu County to the southwest, Wenjiang District to the west, and Pidu District to the north. Qingyang has an area of 68 square kilometers and a population of 460,000.

Tourist attractions
The following are in the Qingyang District:

 Chengdu Huangcheng Mosque
 Chengdu Museum
 Jincheng Art Palace
 Jinsha site
 Qingyang Palace
 Sichuan Art Museum
 Sichuan Provincial Library
 Sichuan Science and Technology Museum

References

External links
 Qingyang District Government official website on Archive.org

Districts of Chengdu